Grevillea byrnesii is a species of flowering plant in the family Proteaceae and is endemic to north-western Australia. It is a shrub with broadly egg-shaped leaves and orange flowers.

Description

Taxonomy
Grevillea byrnesii was first formally described in 1986 by Donald McGillivray in his book New Names in Grevillea (Proteaceae), based on specimens he collected in 1978. The specific epithet (byrnesii) honours Norman Byrnes.

Distribution and habitat
This grevillea grows in shrubland and open woodland on ridge tops and sand dunes in the East Kimberley and Great Sandy Desert regions of northern Western Australia, and in the Victoria River district of the Northern Territory.

Conservation status
Grevillea byrnesii is listed as "least concern" under the Northern Territory Government Territory Parks and Wildlife Conservation Act and as "not threatened" by the Government of Western Australia Department of Biodiversity, Conservation and Attractions.

References

byrnesii
Proteales of Australia
Taxa named by Donald McGillivray
Plants described in 1986
Flora of the Northern Territory
Flora of Western Australia